Cryptocephalus simulans is a species of case-bearing leaf beetle in the family Chrysomelidae. It is found in North America.

Subspecies
These four subspecies belong to the species Cryptocephalus simulans:
 Cryptocephalus simulans conjungens Schaeffer, 1934
 Cryptocephalus simulans conjungeus Schaeffer
 Cryptocephalus simulans eluticollis Schaeffer, 1934
 Cryptocephalus simulans simulans Schaeffer, 1906

References

Further reading

 
 
 

simulans
Articles created by Qbugbot
Beetles described in 1906